The simple station Restrepo is part of the TransMilenio mass-transit system of Bogotá, Colombia, opened in the year 2000.

Location
The station is located in southern Bogotá, specifically on Avenida Caracas with Calles 19 and 22 sur.

It serves the Olaya, San José, and Ciudad Jardín Sur neighborhoods.

History
At the beginning of 2001, the second phase of the Caracas line of the system was opened from Tercer Milenio to the intermediate station Calle 40 Sur. A few months later, service was extended south to Portal de Usme.

The station is named Restrepo due to its proximity to an area of that name located to the west of the station.

Station Services

Old trunk services

Main line service

Feeder Service
There is no feeder service here.

Inter-City Service
There is no Inter-City service

See also
Bogotá
TransMilenio
List of TransMilenio stations

TransMilenio
2001 establishments in Colombia